Omon or OMON may refer to:

 OMON (Отряд милиции особого назначения, Otryad Militsii Osobogo Naznacheniya, Special Purpose Police Unit), Soviet and post-Soviet special police
 Xavier Omon (b. 1985), an American football running back for the Denver Broncos
 Omon, a fictional character in the 1992 Russian novel Omon Ra by Victor Pelevin
 Ọmọn, female name prefix in the Esan language

See also
 
 

 Oman (disambiguation)
 Omen (disambiguation)
 Omin